João Diogo Alves Rodrigues (born 17 September 1998), known as Kikas, is a Portuguese professional footballer who plays for Estrela da Amadora on loan from B-SAD as a striker.

Club career
Kikas was born in Castelo Branco, and finished his youth career with Vitória de Guimarães up north. He made his senior debut with local club Sport Benfica e Castelo Branco in 2017, scoring 17 goals in his only season as the team finished in third position in the third division, the first outside the promotion play-offs zone. He added four in the Taça de Portugal, and in January 2018 signed a three-year contract with C.F. Os Belenenses to be made effective on 1 July.

Kikas' first match in the Primeira Liga took place on 27 August 2018, when he came on as a late substitute in the 1–1 away draw against Moreirense FC. Starting on 22 February of the following year, he netted four times in three consecutive league matches, including in a fixture at S.L. Benfica that ended 2–2.

On 7 May 2019, Kikas agreed to an extension until 2023 with a buyout clause of €15 million. Late into the January 2020 transfer window, he was loaned to LigaPro side U.D. Vilafranquense until 30 June.

References

External links

1998 births
Living people
People from Castelo Branco, Portugal
Sportspeople from Castelo Branco District
Portuguese footballers
Association football forwards
Primeira Liga players
Liga Portugal 2 players
Campeonato de Portugal (league) players
Sport Benfica e Castelo Branco players
Belenenses SAD players
U.D. Vilafranquense players
C.D. Mafra players
U.D. Leiria players
C.F. Estrela da Amadora players
Cypriot First Division players
Doxa Katokopias FC players
Portuguese expatriate footballers
Expatriate footballers in Cyprus
Portuguese expatriate sportspeople in Cyprus